Anton Lazzaro Moro (1687 in San Vito al Tagliamento – 1764) was an Italian abbot, geologist and naturalist. He was one of the leading advocates of plutonism in the early debate that confronted plutonism to neptunism, making him described by some authors as an ultraplutonist. He was the first to discriminate sedimentary rocks from volcanic ones by studying the rocks of volcanic islands. In his study of the crustaceans, he discovered fossils petrified in mountains that led him to deduce those rocks were once buried in the sea.

Book 
 1740, De' crostacei e degli altri Marini corpi che si truovano su' monti

References

External links
 De' Crostacei e Degli Altri Marini Corpi Che Si Trouvano su Monti - full digital facsimile at Linda Hall Library
 

1687 births
1764 deaths
18th-century Italian geologists
Italian abbots
Italian naturalists
People from San Vito al Tagliamento